Commonwealth of the Independent States - Election Monitoring Organization (CIS-EMO) — is an international non-governmental organization founded by the Commonwealth of Independent States. CIS-EMO conducts election observation missions and prepares reports, which sometimes conflict with the findings of Western election monitoring organizations. It was founded in 2003 in Nizhny Novgorod, Russia and was led by Aleksey Kochetkov. As an NGO, it is different from other observers sent by the CIS.

CIS-EMO International Monitoring Missions 

CIS-EMO participated in observing the following elections:
 Parliament elections in the Republic of Kazakhstan, 2004
 President elections in Ukraine, 2004
 Parliament elections in the Republic of Kyrgyzstan, 2005
 Parliament elections in the Republic of Moldova, 2005
 President elections in the Republic of Kyrgyzstan, 2005
 Mayor elections in Kishinev, Moldova, 2005
 Municipal elections in Estonia, 2005
 Parliament elections in the Republic of Azerbaijan, 2005
 President elections in the Republic of Kazakhstan, 2005
 Parliament elections in Transnistria, 2005
 Parliament elections in Ukraine, 2006
 Referendum on independence in Transnistria, 2006
 President elections in Transnistria, 2006
 President elections in Russia, 2008
 Parliament elections in Volgograd Oblast, Russia, 2009
 Parliament elections in Arkhangelsk Oblast, Russia, 2009
 Mayor elections in Kostroma, Russia, 2009
 Parliament elections in Vladimir Oblast, Russia, 2009
 Parliament elections in the Republic of Tatarstan, Russia, 2009
 Parliament elections in the Kabardino-Balkaria Republic, Russia, 2009
 Elections to Moscow City Hall, Russia, 2009
 Parliament elections in South Ossetia, 2009
 Parliament elections in Germany, 2009
 Municipal elections in Estonia, 2009
 President elections in Abkhazia, 2009
 President elections in Ukraine, 2010
 Parliament elections in Ryazan Oblast, Russia, 2010
 Parliament elections in Voronezh Oblast, Russia, 2010
 Referendum on changing the Constitution in Kyrgyzstan, 2010
 Parliament elections in Kyrgyzstan, 2010
 Municipal elections in Ukraine, 2010
 Regional elections in Ukraine, 2010
 Parliament elections in Belgorod Oblast, Russia, 2010
 Parliament elections in Chelyabinsk Oblast, Russia, 2010
 Parliament elections in Estonia, 2011
 Parliament elections in Turkey, 2011
 President elections in Abkhazia, 2011
 Parliament elections in Poland, 2011
 President elections in South Ossetia, 2011
 President elections in Transnistria, 2011
 Parliament elections in Abkhazia, 2012
 President elections in South Ossetia, 2012
 President elections in France, 2012
 Parliamentary elections in Ukraine, 2012

EU Important Members of CIS-EMO Missions 
Status on the moment of participation.
 
 Ján Čarnogurský, former Prime-minister, Slovakia
 Leszek Miller, former Prime-minister, Poland
 Andrzej Lepper, former vice-Prime-minister, Poland
 Paul-Marie Coûteaux, member of EU Parliament, France
 Sabine Lösing, member of EU Parliament, Germany
 Giulietto Chiesa, member of EU Parliament, Italy
 Sylwester Chruszcz, member of EU Parliament, Poland
 Alexander Mirsky, member of EU Parliament, Latvia
 Frank Schwalba-Hoth, former member of EU Parliament, Germany
 Jean-Mari Perrin, former ambassador of France in Azerbaijan and Estonia, France
 Thierry Mariani, member of National Assembly, France
 Michel Voisin, member of National Assembly, France, head of Delegation, the Delegation of France to the OSCE PA, France
 Bogusław Kowalski, member of Sejm, Poland
 Waldemar Kraska, senator, Poland
 Aldis Adamovich, Mayor of Preiļi, Latvia
 François-Xavier Coquin, Professor, College de France, France
 Mirca Margesku, Professor, France
 Olivier Vedrine, Professor, France
 Olivier Decrock, expert, France
 Marie-Helen Berard, Foundation Jacques Chirac, France
 Luca Bionda, Doctor of Political Science, Italy
 Stefano Vernole, expert, Italy
 Pawel Reszka, journalist, Poland
 Rainer Rupp, journalist, Germany

CIS-EMO Activities 

CIS-EMO participates and organizes different events such as:
 
 Round table in the European Parliament ‘Controlled Democracy in Russia?’, March 2009, Brussels;
 International conference ‘ Civic institutions in the election process. Control and maintaining’ in the Public Chamber of Russia, January 2009, Moscow;
 Conference ‘ Voting for democracy? ’, December 2009, Berlin;
 Round table ‘Dynamics in the developing of the democratic institutions in the Republic of South Ossetia in the first year after having been recognized’, May 2009, Tskhinval;
 Round table ‘Investment potential of South Ossetia: complex approach, problems and perspectives’, 2010, Tskhinval;
 School of international observers, September, 2010, Kyrgyzstan;
 OSCE Supplementary Human Dimension Meeting, July 2008, Vienna;
 Supplementary Human Dimension Meeting on Democratic Lawmaking, OSCE, November 2008, Vienna;
 Round table ‘ Civil Society in Law System of Modern Europe’, January 2009, Athens;
 Election conference of the party ‘European Left’, 2009, Berlin;
 International conference ‘Global Europe’, EUP, 2009, Brussels;
 Forum ‘European Union and Russia: new perspectives’, EUP, 2009, Brussels;
 Yaroslavl Global Policy Forum - ‘Modern State: standards of democracy and criteria of effectiveness’, September 2009, Yaroslavl;
 Review Conference, September 2010, Warsaw;
 Forum for Security Co-operation, OSCE, October 2011, Warsaw;
 Round table ‘Election Systems of States of Old Democracy’, RIA Novosti, February, 2012, Moscow.

See also
 Election monitoring
 Aleksey Kochetkov

References

External links
 Official CIS-EMO website

Election and voting-related organizations
International human rights organizations
Non-profit organizations based in Russia